This is a list of films produced by the Tollywood film industry based in Hyderabad, Telangana in 1964.

References

External links
 Earliest Telugu language films at IMDb.com (401 to 416)

1964
Telugu
Telugu films